The 1875 Breconshire by-election was fought on 20 May 1875.  The byelection was fought due to the succession to a peerage of the incumbent Conservative MP, Godfrey Morgan.  It was won by the Liberal candidate William Fuller-Maitland.

References

History of Powys
Brecknockshire
1875 elections in the United Kingdom
1875 in Wales
1870s elections in Wales
May 1875 events
By-elections to the Parliament of the United Kingdom in Welsh constituencies